The following are the national records in track cycling in Finland maintained by the Cycling Union of Finland.

Men

Women

References

External links
 Official website

Finland
Records
Track cyclng
track cycling